The following is a list of current bus routes in Guangzhou (including Nansha, Panyu, Huadu, Zengcheng and Conghua districts) and inter-city bus service between Guangzhou and Foshan or Dongguan.

Operators

Downtown routes

1-100

100-199

200-299

300-399

400-499

500-599

600-699

700-799

800-899

900-999

BRT Routes

Peak Expresses 
Notes: "AM" for morning peak hours only, "PM" for evening peak hours only.

Night Routes

Science City Routes 
Science City Routes are operated in Guangzhou Science City.

Business Routes

Travel & Sightseeing Routes

Holiday Routes

Expressway Routes

Airport Expresses

Airport Bus

Panyu Routes

Panyu 1-30

Panyu 51-88

Panyu 90-165

Panyu 180-199

Panyu 201-202

Metro Feeder Routes

Minibus Routes

Peak Expresses

Holiday Routes

Commercial & Scenic Area Routes

South Railway Station Night Routes 
These routes are night services for passengers arriving at Guangzhou South Railway Station. They're one-way route and cannot get on the bus at the stops along the way.

Higher Education Mega Center Routes 
Notes: "HEMC" for Guangzhou Higher Education Mega Center. HEMC Regular Routes are not included.

Nansha Routes

Express Routes 
Express routes are prefixed with "K".

Main Routes 
Main routes are prefixed with "G".

Normal Routes 
Normal routes have no prefixes.

Minibus Routes 
Minibus routes are prefixed with "W".

Huadu Routes

Conghua Routes

Normal Routes

Express Routes

Minibus Routes

Night Routes

Remote Routes

Zengcheng Routes

Normal Routes

Remote Routes

Guangzhou-Foshan Routes
Notes: "FS" for "Foshan", "GZ" for "Guangzhou".

Guangzhou-Dongguan Routes 
Notes: "DG" for "Dongguan", "GZ" for "Guangzhou".

See also 
 Lines of Guangzhou Water Bus
 Lines of Guangzhou Metro

References 

 "Guangzhou Transportation·Xingxuntong" Mobile App, Guangzhou Municipal Transportation Bureau.
 Routes in Yuexiu, Liwan, Haizhu, Tianhe, Baiyun and Huangpu: 
 Routes in Nansha: 
 Routes in Panyu: 
 Routes in Conghua: 
 Routes in Zengcheng: 
 Routes in Huadu: 
 Routes of Baiyun Airport:

External links 

  
 iPT Guangzhou  Public Transport Information, KOP-SEE 

Transport in Guangzhou
Guangzhou